Akgala (also Romanized as Ākgalā) is a city and capital of Akgala County, in Golestan Province, in northern Iran.  At the 2006 census, its population was 27,402, in 5,811 families.

References

Populated places in Aqqala County

Cities in Golestan Province